WUWS is a public radio station in Ashland, Wisconsin, licensed to the Board of Regents of the University of Wisconsin System. The station is part of Wisconsin Public Radio (WPR), and airs WPR's "Ideas Network", consisting of news and talk programming. WUWS also broadcasts regional news and programming from studios in the Holden Fine Arts Center at the University of Wisconsin-Superior.  The WUWS transmitter is in the Ashland industrial park on the city's east side.

References

External links
WUWS Official website

Wisconsin Public Radio
NPR member stations
Radio stations established in 2011
2011 establishments in Wisconsin
UWS
University of Wisconsin–Superior